W52–FC Porto was a professional road bicycle racing team, which participated in UCI Continental Circuits races before a doping scandal. This team is based in Felgueiras, Portugal, its title sponsors are clothing brand W52, and sports club FC Porto.

Founded in 2004, the team spent the first eight years competing at youth level (up to under-23) until it was registered as a UCI Continental team in 2013, under the commercial designation of OFM–Quinta da Lixa–Goldentimes. That year, the team competed for the first time in the Volta a Portugal, where it won three stages and, through Alejandro Marque, the general classification. The team won the general classification in the following four editions – through Gustavo César (2), Rui Vinhas and João Rodrigues – and added victories in the team classification.

In 2022, the team's sports license was revoked by UCI for doping, with seven cyclists being suspended from three to seven years.

Doping scandal
In March 2021, W52–FC Porto's rider Raúl Alarcón had 19 victories stripped for doping, including two wins at Volta a Portugal. In April 2022, twelve cyclists of W52–FC Porto were made arguidos (formal suspects) in relation to a doping scandal. Later in July, eight cyclists and two mechanics were suspended for 120 days by ADoP, with the UCI revoking the team's sports license days later, thus excluding W52–FC Porto from the 2022 Volta a Portugal.

On 4 October 2022, seven W52–FC Porto riders were banned for doping: João Rodrigues, for a total of seven years, Rui Vinhas, Ricardo Mestre, Ricardo Vilela, Daniel Mestre, José Neves, and Samuel Caldeira, for three years each.

Team roster

Major wins

2004
 Overall Troféu RTP, Gilberto Sampaio
2009
 Overall Volta à Madeira, Bruno Silva
Prologue, Team time trial
Stages 1, 2 & 4, Bruno Silva
Stage 3, Luís Afonso
Stage 5, Jorge Silva
 Overall Troféu RTP, Carlos Baltazar
 Overall Troféu RTP Jocilma/Ribeiro da Silva/Cidade de Lordelo, Carlos Baltazar
 Overall Troféu RTP Município de Valongo, Carlos Baltazar
 Overall Volta a Portugal do Futuro, Marco Cunha
Stages 2, 3 & 4, Marco Cunha
Stage 5 Carlos Baltazar
2010
Stages 2 & 3 Volta a Portugal do Futuro, Bruno Silva
 Overall Volta a Albergaria, Francisco Costa
2013
 Overall Grande Prémio Liberty Seguros, Delio Fernandez
 Overall Troféu Joaquim Agostinho, Eduard Prades
Stage 3, Eduard Prades
 Overall Volta a Portugal, Alejandro Marque
Stage 3, Delio Fernandez
Stage 8, Gustavo Veloso
Stage 9 (ITT), Alejandro Marque
2014
Stage 2 Volta ao Alentejo, Eduard Prades
Stage 5 Volta ao Alentejo, Samuel Caldeira
 Overall Troféu Joaquim Agostinho, Delio Fernandez
 Overall Volta a Portugal, Gustavo Veloso
Stage 9 (ITT), Gustavo Veloso
2015
 Overall Volta a Portugal, Gustavo Veloso
Stages 2 & 7, Delio Fernández
Stages 6 & 9, Gustavo Veloso
 Overall Tour do Rio, Gustavo Veloso
Stage 2, Gustavo Veloso
2016
 Overall Volta a Portugal, Rui Vinhas
Prologue, Rafael Reis
Stages 4, 6 & 10, Gustavo Veloso
2017
Stage 5 Volta ao Algarve, Amaro Antunes
 Overall Vuelta a Asturias, Raúl Alarcón
Stage 3, Raúl Alarcón
Stage 1 Vuelta Ciclista Comunidad de Madrid, Raúl Alarcón
Stage 3 GP Beiras e Serra da Estrela, Raúl Alarcón
 Overall  Troféu Joaquim Agostinho, Amaro Antunes
Stage 2, Amaro Antunes
 Overall Volta a Portugal, Raúl Alarcón
Stages 1 & 4, Raúl Alarcón
Stage 2, Samuel Caldeira
Stages 5 & 10 (ITT), Gustavo Veloso
Stage 9, Amaro Antunes
2018
Stage 5 (ITT) Volta ao Alentejo, Gustavo Veloso
Stage 2 GP Beiras e Serra da Estrela, César Fonte
Stage 3 Vuelta a Asturias, Ricardo Mestre
 Troféu Joaquim Agostinho, José Fernandes
 Overall Grande Prémio de Portugal N2, Raúl Alarcón
Stage 1, Raúl Alarcón
 Overall Volta a Portugal, Raúl Alarcón
Stages 3, 4 & 9, Raúl Alarcón
2019 
 Overall Volta ao Alentejo, João Rodrigues 
Stage 5 (ITT), João Rodrigues 
GP Beiras e Serra da Estrela, Daniel Mestre
Stage 3 Vuelta a Asturias, Edgar Pinto
Prologue GP Internacional Torres Vedras, Gustavo César
 Overall Volta a Portugal, João Rodrigues 
Prologue, Samuel Caldeira
Stage 3, Daniel Mestre 
Stage 4 & 10 (ITT), João Rodrigues 
Stage 9, António Carvalho
2020
 Overall Volta a Portugal, Amaro Antunes
Prologue & Stage 8 (ITT), Gustavo César
Stage 2, Amaro Antunes
2021
 Overall Volta ao Algarve, João Rodrigues
 Road Race Championships, José Fernandes
Stage 4 Volta ao Alentejo, Daniel Mestre
Stage 3 Troféu Joaquim Agostinho, José Fernandes
 Overall Volta a Portugal, Amaro Antunes

National Championships
2021
 Portuguese National Road Race, José Fernandes

See also
Doping in sport
List of doping cases in cycling

References

External links

Cycling teams based in Portugal
Former UCI Professional Continental teams
UCI Continental Teams (Europe)
Cycling teams established in 2004